Six Pillars may refer to:

 Six Pillars House, house in South London
 The Six Pillars of Self-Esteem, book by Nathaniel Branden
 Six pillars in Singapore's defence strategy
 The Six Pillars, featured in The Five Greatest Warriors book
 Six pillars, a lifestyle observed by the Jesus Youth Catholic movement